The 2014 Bahrain GP2 Series round was a pair of motor races held on 5 and 6 April 2014 at the Bahrain International Circuit in Sakhir, Bahrain as part of the GP2 Series. It was the first round of the 2014 GP2 Series and was run in support of the 2014 Bahrain Grand Prix. The first race, a 32-lap feature event, was won by ART Grand Prix driver Stoffel Vandoorne after starting from second position. Julián Leal finished second for the Carlin team and DAMS driver Jolyon Palmer took third. Palmer won the shorter 23-lap sprint race from Rapax's Simon Trummer in second and Leal third.

Palmer took pole position in the feature race by recording the fastest lap in qualifying, but wheelspin at the start dropped him behind Vandoorne. A lap three crash between Axcil Jefferies and Kimiya Sato saw the safety car deployed for the next three laps and Vandoorne kept the lead at the restart. He retained it until his pit stop on the ninth lap. Nathanaël Berthon took the lead for nine laps before Trummer took over the position until his lap 30 pit stop. Vandoorne regained the lead and maintained it to win the feature race. Felipe Nasr started from pole position in the sprint race but lost it to Trummer due to a slow start. Palmer passed Trummer for the lead on the second lap and held it to win.

Vandoorne's feature race victory was his first in the GP2 Series and on his maiden start and Palmer's sprint race win was the fourth of his career. The result put Palmer in the lead of the Drivers' Championship with 38 points, ten in front of second-placed Leal. Vandoorne was in third place, with Trummer fourth and Nasr fifth. DAMS became the leaders of the Teams' Championship by four points over Carlin. ART Grand Prix were a further seven points in third position, while Rapax and Racing Engineering were fourth and fifth, with ten rounds left in the season.

Background

The 2014 Bahrain GP2 Series round was the first of eleven scheduled events in 2014. It was held on 5 and 6 April 2014 at the Bahrain International Circuit in Sakhir, and was run in support of the 2014 Bahrain Grand Prix. Tyre supplier Pirelli brought two types of tyre to the race: two dry compounds (yellow-banded soft "options" and orange-banded hard "primes"). There were a total of 13 teams of 26 participants each entered for both races and each driver piloted the Dallara GP2/11 car.

The final mass test session before the new season took place at the track over 19–21 March. On the first day, Daniel Abt (Hilmer Motorsport) set the fastest lap of the morning session with a time of 1 minute, 40.676 seconds which saw the session twice disrupted when Takuya Izawa (ART Grand Prix) stopped on track and Simon Trummer (Rapax) abandoned his car after hitting the turn ten kerb. Alexander Rossi (Caterham Racing) set the quickest lap of the day in the afternoon session with a 1 minute, 40.604 seconds lap. Rio Haryanto (Caterham Racing) recorded the fastest lap of the three days, a 1 minute, 39.129 seconds in the second day's morning session, and Daniël de Jong (MP Motorsport) paced the afternoon session with a time of 1 minute, 40.508 seconds. In the third (and final) day, Jon Lancaster (MP Motorsport) was the fastest driver in the morning session with a lap of 1 minute, 39.693 seconds, and Abt was quickest in the afternoon session with a time of one minute and 41.061 seconds.

Practice and qualifying

One 45-minute practice session was held on Friday before the two races. In the practice session, held in windy conditions and on a dusty track, Russian Time's Mitch Evans was fastest with a time of 1 minute, 42.062 seconds, six-hundredths of a second faster than ART Grand Prix's Stoffel Vandoorne in second. Raffaele Marciello of Racing Engineering, Abt, Stéphane Richelmi for DAMS, Haryanto. André Negrão of Arden International, Jolyon Palmer in the second DAMS car, Trummer and Conor Daly's Lazarus vehicle completed the top ten ahead of qualifying. Julián Leal understeered off the track and into turn eleven; he spun two corners later. Facu Regalia slid under braking and drove onto the turn thirteen run-off area, while Rossi locked his tyres and ran wide at turn eleven. With two minutes remaining, de Jong stopped on a run-off area leaving the first turn and practice ended early because of the limited amount of time available.

Friday evening's qualifying session ran for 30-minutes. The drivers' fastest lap times determined the starting order for the first race. The pole position winner earned four points for the Drivers' and Teams' Championships. In contrast to previous years, qualifying was held at night, the first such occurrence in the GP2 Series. The track was less dusty than it had been in practice, and multiple drivers had pole position throughout the session. Palmer clinched his first pole position of the season and the second of his GP2 Series career with a time of 1 minute, 38.865 seconds. He flat spotted his first set of tyres and was aware the second set equipped would aid his challenge for pole position. Palmer was joined on the grid's front row by Vandoorne, who was temporarily investigated by the stewards for exceeding track limits at turn 13, but no action was taken. Abt took third having been unable to improve on his lap time. Richelmi improved towards the end of qualifying and was fourth. Haryanto took fifth ahead of sixth-placed Stefano Coletti. Early pace setter Evans fell to seventh as others went faster.

In the closing minutes, Carlin's Felipe Nasr was on a fast lap and closed up to Johnny Cecotto Jr.'s slow Trident car on the racing line through the fourth corner and appeared to execute a sudden manoeuvre resulting in Nasr gesticulating to Cecotto. The stewards deemed Nasr at fault and he incurred a three-grid penalty. Hence, Marciello, Arthur Pic for Campos Racing and Lancaster were ninth and tenth. Leal was the fastest driver not to have received a penalty who was unable to qualify in the top ten. He was followed by Cecotto and Negrão in 13th and 14th. Rossi could not replicate his earlier form and was 15th. Kimiya Sato of Campos Racing in 16th, was closely followed by René Binder of Arden International and Daly. Regalia was 19th, Lazarus' Nathanaël Berthon was 20th and Trummer took 21st. He was followed by de Jong who lost control under braking on cold tyres late in the session. Izaka was 23rd followed by Rapax's Adrian Quaife-Hobbs. Trident's Axcil Jefferies, 25th, lost control of his car's rear while others got their tyres to their optimum temperature early on. Artem Markelov (Russian Time) started from the back of the grid after a spin on cold tyres. This was caused by him running over the turn one kerb. Markelov stalled his car and the session was red flagged to allow the marshals to move his car off the racing line.

Qualifying classification

Notes:
 — Felipe Nasr was given a three-place grid penalty for blocking Johnny Cecotto Jr. during qualifying.

Races
The first ten finishers scored points, with two given to the fastest lap holder. The grid for the second race was determined by the finishing order of the first but the first eight drivers were in reverse order of where they finished. The top eight finishers earned points towards their respective championships.

Feature race

All of the leaders started on the soft compound tyres. Tyre degradation was predicted to be a major factor in the event, and Pirelli believed that the hard compound tyre would last an entire race without issue, although most of the lower starting drivers using this tyre were highly anticipated to create traffic problems. Trummer stalled as the formation lap began and was required to start from the pit lane. When the race commenced at 13:10 Arabia Standard Time (UTC+3), Palmer spun his wheels and Vandoorne overtook him to lead the field into the first corner. Richelmi and Coletti passed Palmer and Abt to move into second and third places. Regalia battled for position on the first lap but sustained a broken front suspension from an impact with Cecotto after exiting turn four which forced Regalia to retire from the race early. Palmer fell to sixth and battled Nasr for the position. Evans overtook Haryanto for fourth place at the first turn at the start of the second lap.

On the following lap, a large crash necessitated the deployment of the safety car. Jefferies defended his position from Sato on the straight linking turns three and four and Sato hit Jefferies's rear. Sato punted Jefferies into a collision with the wall at high speed. Jefferies's vehicle then slid across the tarmac at turn one and stopped in the gravel trap without collecting any other cars. Jefferies was unhurt. At the lap six restart, Vandoorne kept the lead but Richelmi, Coletti, Haryanto and Nasr elected to make pit stops for the mandatory change to the hard compound tyre. Evans and Palmer made their pit stops on the following lap, though Vandoorne committed himself to making track position pay off and extended his advantage to five seconds in front of Pic. Richelmi lost positions but his teammate Palmer moved back up the field and into third place. Nasr became disgruntled when Cecotto forced him to the side of the track battling for position. Vandoorne ceded first to Berthon at the end of lap nine when he made his pit stop and rejoined with a two-second advantage over Palmer.

Haryanto passed Coletti for fourth place at the first corner. Sato took a ten-second stop-and-go penalty on lap 13 for his role in the lap three accident with Jeffries. Trummer use a battle between Binder and Izawa and passed the duo with the same pass in the opening corners for third place on the 14th lap. He passed Daly for second position two laps later. Bertbon entered the pit lane from the lead on lap 18 and narrowly avoided a collision with Trummer as he attempted to enter the pit lane. After leaving the pit lane, Berthon was affected by wheel nut problem that caused him to slow with a suspected loose wheel before returning to the pit lane. Leal was heavily delayed by Markelov allowing Palmer to pull away. Meanwhile, Trummer stayed on track and lost small amounts of his pace by pushing hard. Vandoorne reduced Trummer's lead to eight seconds by the time Trummer made his pit stop at the end of lap 30. He was followed by Coletti, Pic and Nasr with the late-stopping Quaife-Hobbs and Izama moving through the field courtesy of having newer soft compound tyres installed on their cars.

Leal attacked Palmer and passed him by braking later on the inside at turn one for second position. Trummer emerged from the pit lane in tenth with two laps left and had the advantage of the newest set of soft compound tyres enabling him to pass Quaife-Hobbs, Nasr and Binder on the final lap and settle for seventh place. Vandoorne maintained the lead and crossed the start/finish line after 32 laps to take his maiden GP2 Series win on his debut. Leal finished second, 1 seconds behind and Palmer held off Coletti for third. Debutants Pic and Izawa finished in fifth and sixth places; the latter narrowly held off Trummer on the main straight. Nasr, Binder and Quaife-Hobbs made up positions eight through ten. De Jong, Daly, Abt, Evans and Markelov, Haryanto, Lancaster, Marciello, Richelmi, Negrão, Cecotto, Rossi and Berthon were the final classified finishers.

Feature race classification
Drivers who scored championship points are denoted in bold.

Sprint race

The second race on 6 April began at 14:15 local time. All drivers chose to begin on the hard compound tyres. Vandoorne's access cover above his car's pedals detached on an installation lap into turn four, prompting his mechanics to apply tape over it. Tyre preservation was key since temperatures for the sprint race were higher than the previous day's feature event. For the second day running, it was not the pole sitter who led the field entering the first corner as Nasr spun his wheels and Trummer took the lead as Palmer moved into second. Leal moved from seventh to third, and Quaife-Hobbs settled into fourth position. Coletti stalled on the grid and drivers were forced to swerve to avoid hitting his stationary car. Coletti and Maricello's cars were pushed into the pit lane by mechanics to allow them to start. Vandoorne made a slow start and fell to eleventh. At the beginning of lap two, Trummer was unable to hold off Palmer who slipstreamed him on the main straight and lost the lead into the first turn.a

Further down the field that same lap, Vandoorne passed his teammate Izawa before striking the rear of de Jong's car at turn four, damaging his front wing and slowing Vandoorne, who was forced into the sand by the faster Markelov before he could enter the pit lane for repairs and fell out of the top ten. Rossi sustained a puncture on the third lap and was required to make an unscheduled pit stop for soft compound tyres in an attempt to set the fastest lap. Since no mandatory pit stops had to be made, Palmer still led though Trummer was less than a second behind him. Leal was close by despite raising concerns over suspected damage to his car. Evans passed de Jong for eighth place on lap six while Haryanto fell behind Izawa, Daly and Markelow by the 11th lap. By the halfway point, questions were raised about which drivers used their tyres too hard early on and who used their compounds economically with the view for an late attack. The primary action at this point was Abt and Berthon battling for 15th place and both drivers caught Marciello's lapped car. Daly retired on lap 15 after sustaining a possible puncture caused by driving over a turning vane from Binder's car ahead of him.

The first three runners were separated by less than two seconds with six laps left. Palmer and Leal received frequent reminders to preserve their tyres, while Trummer was informed over the radio that to have any hopes of winning the race he had to attack. Quaife-Hobbs slowed because his tyres had degraded enough to enable Nasr to close up to him. Their battle allowed Pic, Richelmi, Evans and Binder to close up causing jostling and minor contact between all six cars. Nasr initially passed Quaife-Hobbs at the final corner on the 30th lap but Quaife-Hobbs reclaimed fourth place into the first turn. Nasr slipstreamed past Quaife-Hobbs on the outside into turn four. On the final lap, Richelmi overtook Pic at turn eight for fifth place while Pic and Markelov lost positions to Evans and Binder. Trummer was unable to overhaul Palmer who kept the lead for the rest of the race to achieve his fourth victory in the GP2 Series. Trummer followed eight-tenths of a second later in second for his first podium finish since the 2009 International Formula Master. Leal was a further six-tenths of a second behind in third, with Nasr fourth and Richelmi fifth. Quaife-Hobbs, Evans and Binder were in sixth to eighth. Pic, Markelov, de Jong, Izawa, Abt, Cecotto, Lancaster, Haryanto, Berthon, Negrão, Sato and Regalia, Vandoorne, Coletti, Marciello and Rossi were the last of the 25 classified finishers.

Sprint race classification
Drivers who scored championship points are denoted in bold.

Post-race

The top three drivers of both races appeared on the podium to collect their trophies and in a later press conference. After the feature race, Vandoorne believed he could have probably run longer with the soft-compound tyres but chose to enter the pit lane to ensure he would keep the lead and felt his team made the correct decision, "We just wanted to be safe and keep the lead because we already had made two more laps than the others on the soft tyres." Leal was delighted to finish second and did not believe he could have finished in the position because of where he started but his team noted his pace was strong throughout pre-season testing, "It’s great that we were able to replicate that and get here today.” He said his engineer told him to push for two laps gaining him positions and was not attempting to attack Palmer but passed him by conserving his tyres towards the end of the race. Third-place finisher Palmer spoke of his disappointment because he felt his team could have challenged for the victory but praised the strategy that moved him up the field. He admitted that work needed done on his starts but did not change his strategy after his slow getaway.

When the sprint race had finished, Palmer said on the podium, "Yesterday was first to sixth in one lap and now it is sixth to first so it definitely made up for it and I am absolutely delighted. We had done a lot of homework on the start and the tyre degradation and I think we nailed them both. He described the race as "tough" and drove more conservatively with the knowledge he acculmated from the previous day's race and also made set-up and balance changes. Trummer said it felt "really good" to finish second and knew beforehand he would achieve a good result in the sprint race. He commented he did not defend too much against Palmer on the second lap because of his speed and was aware he had to conserve tyre life, adding, "But I was a bit wrong because he kept this strong pace all race long. Even at the end of the race I thought he would struggle more but he didn’t. It was really hard to attack him. That was a great race. I had a great pace and I’m happy with P2." Third-place finisher Leal spoke of an "unbelievable" start of the season for himself and his team but focused attention on the following event.

Following this, the first round of the season, Palmer led the Drivers' Championship with 38 points, ten ahead of second-placed Leal. Vandoorne was in third on 25 points, with Trummer a further seven points behind in fourth, and Nasr was fifth with 12 points. DAMS assumed the lead of the Teams' Championship with 44 points; Carlin was close behind in second with 40 points. ART Grand Prix was in third place on 33 points with Rapax ten points behind in fourth place. Racing Engineering were in fifth on 12 points with ten rounds left in the season.

Standings after the round

Drivers' Championship standings

Teams' Championship standings

 Note: Only the top five positions are included for both sets of standings.

References

External links

Bahrain
GP2
Bahrain GP2 Series round